James T. Reid (born December 1, 1950) is an American football coach and former player.  He is the defensive coordinator and linebackers coach at Massachusetts Maritime Academy, a position he has held since 2022. Reid served as head football coach at the University of Massachusetts Amherst (UMass) from 1986 to 1991, University of Richmond from 1995 through 2003, and Virginia Military Institute (VMI) from 2006 until 2007, compiling an overall college football record of 87–101–3.

Playing career
Reid played football at the University of Maine before graduating in 1973.

Coaching career

UMass
Beginning in 1973, Reid spent 19 years coaching at University of Massachusetts Amherst (UMass), where he spent two seasons as a graduate assistant, eleven seasons as an assistant coach, and six seasons as the head coach. He resigned in 1992 after being told he would have to reneg on scholarships promised to some incoming freshmen.

Richmond
Reid then became defensive coordinator at Richmond for 1992 and 1993 seasons.  He was defensive coordinator at Boston College for the 1994 season before returning to Richmond as head coach in 1995. As the Spiders' head coach for nine seasons, from 1995 until 2003, he recorded a record of 48–53–1.  This ranks him third at Richmond in total wins and 14th at Richmond in winning percentage.

Syracuse and Bucknell
Reid spent the 2004 season as the defensive line coach at Syracuse, and spent the 2005 season as defensive line coach at Bucknell.

VMI
Reid was the 30th head football coach at the Virginia Military Institute (VMI) in Lexington, Virginia.  He held that position from the 2006 season until the end of the 2007 season. His career coaching record at VMI was 3 wins, 19 losses, and 0 ties.  This ranks him 25th at VMI in total wins and 28th at VMI in winning percentage.

Miami Dolphins
Reid was hired by the Miami Dolphins of the National Football League (NFL) on January 23, 2008 as their outside linebackers coach.
Reid was awarded the "game football" by coach Tony Sparano after the Dolphins 17–10 win over the San Diego Chargers on October 5, 2008.

Virginia
On January 7, 2010, Reid was officially announced as the new defensive coordinator and associate head coach of the Virginia Cavaliers.

Iowa
On February 14, 2013, Reid was officially hired as a defensive assistant for the Iowa Hawkeyes.

Boston College
On January 6, 2016, Reid was chosen by coach Steve Addazio as defensive coordinator for Boston College. Reid was also the former defensive coordinator for the 7-4-1 Eagles in 1994 (who defeated Kansas State in the Aloha Bowl).

Massachusetts Maritime Academy
Reid joined the staff at Massachusetts Maritime Academy in early 2022 as the defensive coordinator and linebackers coach.

Personal life
Reid earned his bachelor's degree in history and social studies from the University of Maine in 1973. He graduated Medford (MA) High School in 1968.  His son, Matt Reid, is assistant baseball coach at FGCU.

Head coaching record

References

External links
 Massachusetts Maritime profile
 UMass profile
 Boston College profile

1950 births
Living people
American football defensive backs
Boston College Eagles football coaches
Bucknell Bison football coaches
Iowa Hawkeyes football coaches
Maine Black Bears football players
Massachusetts Maritime Buccaneers football coaches
Miami Dolphins coaches
Richmond Spiders football coaches
Syracuse Orange football coaches
UMass Minutemen football coaches
Virginia Cavaliers football coaches
VMI Keydets football coaches
Sportspeople from Medford, Massachusetts